Detective Chinatown is a 2015 Chinese comedy-mystery buddy film directed by Chen Sicheng and starring Wang Baoqiang and Liu Haoran. It was released in China on 31 December 2015. A sequel, was released in February 2018, and a third film was released in February 2021.

Plot
After being rejected from a police college, Qin Feng (Liu Haoran) goes to Bangkok for a vacation. He plans to spend time with his "uncle" Tang Ren (Wang Baoqiang), who is reputed to be the number one detective of Chinatown in Bangkok. Tang Ren turns out to be a sleazy petty swindler who is an underling of incompetent police sergeant Kon Tai (Xiao Yang). Meanwhile, the main suspect in a gold robbery case, Sompat, is murdered and the gold goes missing. The gold belongs to prominent local gangster Mr. Yan (Chin Shih-chieh). Kon Tai and his ambitious rival Huang Landeng (Chen He), are put into competition by the police chief to solve the case and retrieve the gold in order to be appointed the next deputy chief.

After a series of mischievous adventures with Qin in Bangkok, Tang is pursued by police as he is the main suspect in Sompat's murder, being the last person to enter and leave Sompat's workshop where he was murdered. Tang seeks the help of Qin, who turns out to be a prodigy in solving crimes. During their exodus from the pursuit, Qin and Tang are captured by Sompat's cohorts who wish to locate the lost gold. Qin and Tang, now wanted criminals, are able to escape and hide in the home of Xiang (Tong Liya), Tang's beautiful landlady. However, they are followed by the gold robbers, who arrive just before Kon and then Huang, leading to an awkward confrontation between all parties.

Qin later finds out why Tang is implicated: on the day of the murder, Tang received a call asking him to deliver a boxed Buddha statue from Sompat's workshop at midnight. The pair, deciding to stay in Thailand rather than flee, goes to the parking lot where Tang delivered the box. Qin finds a trace of fish in the area, after which they go to a nearby seafood market and a junk yard. That night, Qin and Tang searches the workshop, narrowly avoiding an encounter with the robbers. Qin deduces that Huang Landeng's assistant, Tony, is part of the scheme.

To solve the murder, Qin and Tang must watch the surveillance footage of the workshop. As it is kept in Huang's computer, Tang lures the police force away while Qin and Kon retrieve the footage and other documents about Sompat. After translating the documents, Qin finds that Sompat's son went missing a year prior and that Sompat frequented a café. Following the trail, Qin and Tang are led to Snow (Zhang Zifeng), who was a school classmate of Sompat's son.

Qin and Tang are soon captured and led to Mr. Yan, who gives them 3 days to find the stolen gold. Qin and Tang split up, with Qin meeting Snow for a second time and Tang being pursued again by Huang. Qin discovers that Snow's stepfather works at the junk yard near the parking lot, making him a suspect.

Qin and Tang rejoin at the workshop, where they hypothesize that the murderer hid in the workshop for one week (As the surveillance footage overrides itself after a week), killed Sompat before Tang's delivery, and escaped the workshop by hiding in the box Tang delivered. They are suddenly ambushed by the masked murderer, who sets the workshop on fire. Qin and Tang narrowly escape.

After learning that Xiang is kidnapped by Tony, Qin and Tang confront and defeat him. The pair delivers Xiang to the hospital, where they witness a shootout between the police and the other three robbers. Qin and Tang return to Snow's home yet again, but find that she has overdosed and is on the verge of death. After delivering Snow to the hospital, Qin finds the story behind the murder in Snow's journal. Snow was raped by Sompat, which her stepfather found out, leading him to kill Sompat. The gold robbery and the murder are unrelated.

After a car chase around Bangkok, Qin and Tang finally reveal to the police that the lost gold was hidden in a statue at the workshop. At the hospital where Snow resides, Qin and Tang convey their findings to the police in the presence of Snow and her stepfather. After being exposed, the stepfather is killed by Kon's car when he jumps out of the hospital window. Kon is subsequently promoted to deputy chief due to his prevention of the murderer's escape, to the annoyance of a severely injured Huang.

However, Qin soon realizes that Sompat was homosexual, meaning he did not rape Snow. He realizes that Snow was stalked by Sompat because he suspected her of killing his missing son. Thus, Snow planned Sompat's murder, framed him for rape in her journal, and fabricated the evidence to get rid of both Sompat and her pervert stepfather, whom she loathed. Qin confronts Snow, but decides to leave her.

In the credits, Qin and Tang are invited to an Intel centre where they are called to solve a new case in New York.

Cast
 Wang Baoqiang as Tang Ren
Qin's Uncle, a swindler who lives in Bangkok and claims to be the best detective of Chinatown. Tang accepted an anonymous delivery job before Qin arrived and became the last person entered Sompat's murder scene. Therefore, both the police and the robbers consider him as the one who murdered Sompat and left with the gold.
 Liu Haoran as Qin Feng
Tang's nephew, a talented teenager who has astonishing perception and memory yet was rejected from the police college for an presumably because he said he wanted to "commit the perfect crime" during the entry test. He went to Bangkok for a vacation, then gets involved in Sompat's case by accident. 
 Tong Liya as Xiang
Tang's love interest and landlady.
 Chen He as Huang Landeng
Kon Tai's rival in the police department. He is ambitious and eager to solve Sompat's murder case.
 Xiao Yang as Kon Tai
A police sergeant of Chinatown police department. He is Tang's close friend and rival to sergeant Huang.
 Xiaoshenyang as Bei Ge
 Pan Yueming as Lee
 Marc Ma as Tony
Huang's deputy. 
 Zhang Zifeng as Snow
 Zhao Yingjun as Vietnamese 
One of the gold robbers.

 Irfani Zhang as Ren Hui

Reception
The film grossed  in previews at the Chinese box office.

It was the ninth highest grossing film in China in 2015, grossing $126 million.

Sequels 
A sequel, Detective Chinatown 2, also written and directed by Chen Sicheng and set in New York City's Chinatown, was released on 16 February 2018 during the Chinese New Year holiday season. In addition of the two leads of Wang Baoqiang and Liu Haoran reprising their roles, new supporting cast members in Detective Chinatown 2 include Xiao Yang, Michael Pitt, Natasha Liu Bordizzo, Yuen Wah, and Satoshi Tsumabuki. Another sequel, Detective Chinatown 3, was released on 12 February 2021.

Nomination

References

External links
 
 

2015 films
2010s Mandarin-language films
2010s buddy comedy films
2010s comedy mystery films
Chinese comedy mystery films
Chinese detective films
Films directed by Chen Sicheng
Films scored by Nathan Wang
Films set in Thailand
Wuzhou Film Distribution films
Wanda Pictures films
2015 comedy films